Bucinnazine (AP-237, 1-butyryl-4-cinnamylpiperazine) is an opioid analgesic drug that was widely used in China to treat pain in cancer patients as of 1986. It is one of the most potent compounds among a series of piperazine-amides first synthesized and reported in Japan in the 1970s. Bucinnazine  has analgesic potency comparable to that of morphine but with a relatively higher therapeutic index.

The drug was initially claimed to be a non-narcotic analgesic. However, subsequent studies have shown bucinnazine  and similar acyl piperazines to be potent and selective agonists of μ-opioid receptor (MOR) with relatively low affinity for the δ-opioid receptor and the κ-opioid receptor.  In accordance with these studies, results from the intravenous self-administration experiments in rats showed that bucinnazine  has a marked reinforcing effect with tolerance and dependence quickly developing.  In addition, the morphine antagonist naloxone reverses the effect of bucinnazine and precipitates withdrawal symptoms in bucinnazine treated rats further indicating a mechanism of analgesia mediated via selective agonist activity at μ-opioid receptors.

Derivatives
2-methyl-AP-237 has been sold on the grey market as a designer opioid, first identified by a police forensic laboratory in Slovenia in March 2019.

See also
 AP-238
 Azaprocin
 Diphenpipenol
 MT-45
 Sunifiram

References

Analgesics
Euphoriants
Mu-opioid receptor agonists
Piperazines
Amides